The 1906 Georgia Tech Yellow Jackets football team represented the Georgia Institute of Technology during the 1906 Southern Intercollegiate Athletic Association football season. In the third season under coach John Heisman, Georgia Tech posted a 6–3–1 record.

Before the season
In no small part thanks to Heisman, the forward pass was legalized in 1906.

Schedule

Game summaries

Maryville

Sources:

Under the new rules, Maryville surprised Tech with a tie, 6–6.

The starting lineup was: Hightower (left end), Monroe (left tackle), Bell (left guard), Luck (center), Henderson (right guard), McCarty (right tackle), Hill (right end), Robert (quarterback), Davids (left halfback), Means (right halfback), Sweet (fullback).

North Georgia
In the second week of play, Tech defeated North Georgia 11–0.

Grant
Against Grant, Tech won  18–0. The game proved a punting duel between Brown and Grant's Reupert. The highlight of the game was a 40-yard punt return for a touchdown by Tech's Hightower.

Sewanee
Sewanee defeated Georgia Tech 16–0. The game's account is the first involving the jump shift. The starting lineup was Brown (left end), Luck (left tackle), Bell (left guard), Monroe (center), Smith (right guard), McCarty (right tackle), Hill (right end), Robert (quarterback), Hightower (left halfback), Davies (right halfback), Sweet (fullback).

Davidson

Sources:

Lob Brown was responsible for the win over Davidson by a 40-yard field goal.

Auburn
Brown also helped in the victory over rival Auburn, the school's first.

Georgia
"Tech's cup of joy overflowed" as they defeated rival Georgia 17–0. An ambitious game with Vanderbilt was scheduled.

Vanderbilt

Sources:

Vanderbilt defeated Tech in the rain and mud of Atlanta 37–6. Lobster Brown scored Tech's points. Atlanta Constitution sportswriter Alex Lynn wrote after the  game that Owsley Manier was: "the greatest fullback and all round man ever seen in Atlanta." He again scored five touchdowns.

The starting lineup was: Brown (left end); McCarty (left tackle); Snyder (left guard); Monroe (center); Henderson (right guard); Luck (right tackle); Brown (right end); Robert (quarterback); Davies (left halfback); Hightower (right halfback); Adamson (fullback).

Mercer
The season's largest win came over Mercer, 61–0.

Clemson
The season ended with a disappointing, 10–0 loss to Clemson. Fritz Furtick scored Clemson's first touchdown. Baseball star Ty Cobb attended the game.

Postseason
At season's end, Brown was elected captain for next season.

References

Additional sources
 

Georgia Tech
Georgia Tech Yellow Jackets football seasons
Georgia Tech Yellow Jackets football